Sri Venkateshwara Swami Temple is a landmark vaishnavite temple situated in the hill town of Tirumala at Tirupati in Chittoor district of Andhra Pradesh, India. The Temple is dedicated to Lord Venkateswara, an incarnation of Vishnu, who is believed to be appeared here to save mankind from the trials and troubles of Kali Yuga.

The presiding deity Lord Venkateswara is represented with five deities including the main deity (moolavirat) and other deities known as Pancha Beramulu. Besides Lord Venkateshwara, the temple also abodes the deities of Krishna and Rukmini, Chakrathalvaar, Rama, Sita, Lakshmana, Hanuman, Vishwaksena, Sugriva, Angada and Salagramulu.

Pancha beramulu

Moolavirat or Dhruva Beram
 

The main stone deity of Lord Venkateshwara is called Dhruva Beram (beram means "deity", and dhruva means "pole star" or "fixed").

Kautuka Beram or Bhoga Srinivasa

This is a tiny one-foot (0.3 m) silver deity, which was given to the temple in 614 AD by Pallava Queen Samavai Perindevi, and has never been removed from the temple from the day it was installed.  This deity is popularly known as Bhoga Srinivasa, because it enjoys all the Bhoga (worldly pleasures) which the Moolavirat has. This deity sleeps in a golden cot every night and receives Sahasra Kalashabishekam every Wednesday. This deity is always placed near the left foot of Moolavirat and is always connected to the main deity by a holy Sambandha Kroocha.  The deity is always faced at an angle of 45 degrees towards the devotees, because it holds a Prayoga ("ready to strike") Chakra.

Snapana Beram or Ugra Srinivasa

This idol of the Lord represents the anger part of Lord Venkateswara.  He remains inside the sanctum sanctorum, and comes out on only one day each year: on Kaishika Dwadasi, before the sunrise. Snapana means "cleansing". The idol is cleansed  daily with holy waters, milk, curd, ghee, sandalwood paste, turmeric, and so on.

Malayappa Swami - Utsava Beram

This is the form of the Lord which comes out of the temple to see the devotees.  This deity is also called Malayappa, and his consorts are Sridevi and Bhudevi.  These three deities were found in a cave called Malayappan Konai in the holy Tirumala Hills. Originally Ugra Srinivasa was the Utsava Beram (the procession deity), and frequently disastrous fires were happening whenever the deity was taken out for processions. People prayed to the Lord for a solution. The Lord appeared in dreams, and ordered the people to find a suitable set of idols hidden in the holy Tirumala hills for the Utsavas (procession). The hunt began, and the villagers found the idol. They called it Malayappa, which means "King of the Hills". After these idols were brought to the temple, the number of programmes increased including Nitya Kalyanaotsavam, Sahasra Deepalankara Seva, Arjita Brahmotsavam, Nithyotsavam, Dolotsavam, and others. Jewels worth millions of rupees have been donated as offerings to these idols.

Bali Beram or Koluvu Srinivasa

This panchaloha idol resembles the main deity, and represents the presiding officer for all activities and rituals in the temple. The idol is also called Bali Beram. Koluvu Srinivasa is regarded as the guardian deity of the temple that presides over its financial and economic affairs. Daily offerings are made to the deity, with a presentation of accounts known as Koluvu Seva.

Rama, Sita, Lakshmana and Hanuman

The temple hosts the panchaloha deities of Lord Rama along with his consort Sita and brother Lakshmana. The idol of Lord Rama in Tirumala is referred to as Sri Raghunatha, Lord of Raghu (clan). The left arm of the idol is raised to hold his bow and the right arm slopes downwards to hold the arrow. The face is tilted to the right side slightly and is capped by a crown that accentuates the tilt. The feet are set wide on a lotus pedestal with the left foot overshooting it. The idol is usually seen with a bow in the left hand of the Lord and an arrow in the right arm.

The idol of Sita is always seen on the right hand side of Lord Rama. The idol rests on a lotus pedestal and has the right arm by the side and the left arm holding a lotus bud. The idol of Sita does not have a crown. The idol of Lakshmana is always placed on the left hand side of Rama. The idol is a smaller but mostly the similar replica of Lord Rama. While the posture (madhyama tala and tribhanga pose) is similar to his elder brother, the idol differs from Lord Rama in a few ways. The deity of Hanuman is usually kept sideways on to the right side of Lord Rama. The right hand is bent at the elbow and touches the mouth in a posture that conveys Hanuman's mark of respect for Rama. The left hand is in the Katyavalambita pose (left palm closed and resting on the waist and the outer side of the palm is seen to the onlookers)

Krishna and Rukmini

There are idols of Krishna an incarnation of Vishnu and his consort Rukmini in the Garbhagriha. The idol of Lord Krishna is seen in the navanitha nritya (celestial dance) pose of a child. The lord is seen in the dancing pose with his left hand stretched out in a dancing pose and the left leg placed on the pedestal. The right leg is bent at the knee and doesn't rest on the pedestal. The right hand holds a dollop of butter. The idol of Rukmini devi has a lotus in the left hand while the right hand is in the blessing pose. The idol is on a lotus pedestal. The details of the exact date when the idol was consecrated, the history of the idol and whether it was found/made along with the Krishna idol is not known.

Vishwaksena Deity

Vishwaksena is a trusted attendant of Lord Vishnu and is believed to be Vishnu's attendant who is in-charge of the Lord's wealth. Vishwaksena is considered to be very powerful with the abilities to create and destroy life with his thought. Vishwaksena is also considered as the commander-in-chief of Lord Vishnu's army.

The Deity of Vishwaksena in the TTD temple used to be placed in the Ramar Medai (Elevated platform for Rama) and is currently seen in the temple space outside the sanctum sanctorum. The deity is seen in the seated position with the right leg bent at the knee and resting freely from his seat but not touching the ground. The left leg is folded and goes beneath the right leg. The arms of the deity is in the exact replica of Dhruva Bera (main deity)- the upper two holding a sankha and chakra, the right lower in Avgana hastam (blessing posture), and the left lower hand is in Gada hastam (palm resting on the hip).

The exact date of installation of the deity is not known or recorded in the temple epigraphs.

The deity receives the share of the daily worship in the temple. The deity is included in the weekly Sahasra Kalashabhishekam along with Sri Malayappa Swami and his consorts and the main deity. The day prior to the start of the annual Brahmotsavam, the Vishwaksena deity (Lord's commander-in-chief) in the company of other deities related to Vishnu - Ananta (Lord's Conch and war announcing instrument), Garuda (Eagle and Lord's vehicle) and Sudarsana (Lord's weapon), are taken to the Vasanta mandapam (Spring hall) and oversee the Ankurarpana ceremony (sowing nine types of seeds for germination in decorated earthen plates). After the ceremony, Vishwaksena is taken in a procession when he is believed to inspect the correctness of all the arrangements made for the festival. After the procession Vishwaksena is honoured by an Asthanam (seat) in Tirumala-raya mandapam. After recital of holy chants, he goes to Ankurarpana mandapam with Ananta, Garuda and Sudarsana and stays there during the entire Brahmotsavam period.

In the temple complex, on the north-east corner, there is a separate temple with an installed deity for Vishwaksena. The temple is called Sri Vishwaksena Temple and daily prayers are offered to the deity as per the Vaikhanasa Agamam. The deity in this temple is adorned with the garland adorned on the main deity, the previous day.

Sugriva Deity
The Deity of Sugriva, the monkey-king and friend of Lord Rama, is seen with folded hands in a stance resembling prayer to the Lord. According to the temple legend, the Deity is seen in a scene of the Hindu epic Ramayana. Sugriva is seen with folded hands after he prays to Lord Rama, not to grant protection to Vibishana.

The exact date of the consecration of the Deity is unknown though it is believed to have been installed along with the deities of Rama, Sita and Lakshmana. The deities of Hanuman and Angada are also believed to have been installed at the same time in the Ramar medai (Elevated platform of Lord Rama). When the deities of Rama, Sita, and Lakshmana were moved inside the garba griha, the Deity of Sugriva was moved briefly as well. In the mid-1990s, Sugriva's Deity along with other deities were moved to a room outside the sanctum sanctorum, where pilgrims are provided with blessings and thirtam (holy consecrated water).

Angada Deity
The Deity of Angada, the monkey-prince and son of Vali and Tara and the nephew of Sugriva, is seen with the right hand pointed out. 

According to the temple legend, the Deity is seen in a scene from the Hindu epic Ramayana when Angada is pointing towards the southern sky to indicate the arrival of Vibishana as Sugriva prays to Lord Rama, not to grant protection to Vibishana - the brother of demon-king Ravana.

References

Tirumala Venkateswara Temple